Draw the Curtains is the fifth studio album by Will Hoge. It was released on October 9, 2007, by Rykodisc.

Critical reception

Andrew Leahey of AllMusic writes that Will Hoge was, "touring America's smoky barroom circuit, inciting his audiences to alternately weep into their whiskeys and hit the dancefloor." and that, "Perhaps that's why his first offering on the Rykodisc label, Draw the Curtains, boasts the sort of informed authenticity that American Idol finalists can only seem to muster several years into their post-TV career. This is an album of countrified, bloodshot-eyed soul -- a difficult genre to execute, perhaps, but one that Hoge often nails."

Anthony Kuzminski  of AntiMusic gives this album 5 smiley faces and concludes his review with, "The next time someone tells me 'they don't make albums like they used to', I'm going to tell them to buy Will Hoge's Draw the Curtains so they can have that same spiritual awakening."

Bill Clifford of JamBase says, "Nashville based Will Hoge has been one of America’s most under appreciated singer-songwriters for far too long. He’s survived numerous changes in band personnel common to any act that puts in over 200 nights a year on the road for a minimal wage, as well a major label contract debacle. However, he’s an astounding, visceral live performer and as his latest studio release, Draw The Curtains (Rykodisc) proves, a captivating songwriter."

Alternative Addiction writes, "In his latest effort Draw the Curtains, his blues/soul influences are at the forefront (Cocker, Redding), but there’s an element of southern-pop, almost country on this disc that’s best compared to Bob Seger and that really stands out."

Gibson's Nicole Keiper's review begins, "Will Hoge evokes opposite things, calling an album something like Draw the Curtains. He could mean the end of an act, signaling the house lights to rise and the brooms to start their work, or maybe just the opposite—pulling the curtains open to let the sunshine in for a new day’s dawn."

Lesley Jones of American Songwriter rates the album a 4 out of 5 stars and writes, "Well-known tourman Will Hoge unloads the powerful combination of reality and soul on his newest studio album, Draw the Curtains."

Track listing

Track information and credits adapted from Discogs and AllMusic. Track information and credits also verified from the album's liner notes.

Musicians
Will Hoge – Acoustic Guitar, Electric Guitar, Handclapping, Harmonica, Percussion, Stomping, Vocals
Dan Baird – Electric Guitar
Sigurdur Birkis – Drums
Pat Buchanan – 12 String Electric Guitar, Electric Guitar
Chris Carmichael – Fiddle, Strings
Ken Coomer – Drums, Percussion
Jefferson Crow – Fender Rhodes, Piano
Pete Finney – Pedal Steel
Adam Fluhrer – Electric Guitar
Steve Hinson – Lap Steel Guitar
Scotty Huff – Horn
Rami Jaffee – Hammond Organ
Tim Marks – Bass, Bass Instrument
Jerry Dale McFadden – Accordion, Hammond B3, Hammond Organ
Angela Primm – Handclapping, Stomping, Background Vocals
Garrison Starr – Background Vocals
Dean Tomasek – Bass, Bass Instrument
Gale West – Handclapping, Background Vocals
Reese Wynans – Hammond Organ

Production
Charlie Brocco – Audio Engineer, Audio Production, Engineer, Mixing, Producer
Ken Coomer – Producer, Audio Production, Mixing
Eric Conn – Mastering
Bryan Vastano – Assistant
Leslie Tolman – Assistant
Nicole Giacco – Assistant
Mara Wish Buttleman – Assistant
Patrick Miller – Audio Engineer, Assistant Engineer
Ruby Marshand – A&R
Jamie Hoyt Vitale – Art Direction, Design
Andrew Southam – Photography

References

External links
Will Hoge Official Site

2007 albums
Will Hoge albums
Rykodisc albums